Closing may refer to:

Business and law
 Closing (law), a closing argument, a summation
 Closing (real estate), the final step in executing a real estate transaction
 Closing (sales), the process of making a sale
 Closing a business, the process by which an organization ceases operations

Computing
 Closing (morphology), in image processing
 Finalize (optical discs), the optional last step in the authoring process
 CLOSING, a TCP connection state

Other uses
 Closing a letter or e-mail (see valediction)
 "Closing", a song by Enter Shikari from the album Take to the Skies

See also
 Closing argument
 Closing Bell, CNBC television programs
 Closing credits
 Closing statement (disambiguation)
 Closing time (disambiguation)
 Close (disambiguation)
 Closed (disambiguation)
 Closure (disambiguation)
 Conclusion (disambiguation)